Red Planet Hotels, founded in 2010, is a privately owned regional hotel company focused on Asia’s expanding value hotel sector. The company owns and operates 32 hotels in Indonesia, Japan, the Philippines, and Thailand with a total of 5,151 rooms.

History 
Red Planet opened its first hotel in  Hat Yai, Thailand in December 2011. In July 2015, Red Planet announced that it had ended its partnership with Tune Hotels and rebranded all of its properties in the Philippines, Thailand, Indonesia, and Japan.

In September 2016, Reuters reported Red Planet received a USD 70 million investment from Goldman Sachs to facilitate Red Planet’s planned regional expansion.

Since 2010, Red Planet has raised USD 240 million in funding from investors. The company said it planned to raise one final round of capital before an IPO.

Rooms 
Red Planet Hotels' rooms are consistent across all properties. Additionally, the hotel offers twin, double, deluxe double, and disabled accessible rooms.

Listed Subsidiaries 
In June 2014, Red Planet's Indonesian subsidiary listed on the Indonesia Stock Exchange. Red Planet Japan is also listed on the JASDAQ Securities Exchange.

Hotel Locations 
As of August 2020, Red Planet operates 32 hotels in four countries and has 7 hotels under development.

Operational:
Red Planet Manila Amorsolo
Red Planet Angeles City
Red Planet Manila Aseana City
Red Planet Cagayan de Oro
Red Planet Cebu City
Red Planet Davao City
Red Planet Manila Mabini
Red Planet Manila Makati
Red Planet Manila Ortigas
Red Planet Quezon Timog
Red Planet Manila Bay
Red Planet Aurora Boulevard
Red Planet Manila Binondo

Under Development:
Red Planet Quezon Avenue
Red Planet Cebu Fuente Circle
Red Planet Manila The Fort
Red Planet Quezon North Avenue
Red Planet Manila Entertainment City

Operational:
Red Planet Bangkok Asoke
Red Planet Hat Yai
Red Planet Phuket Patong
Red Planet Pattaya
Red Planet Bangkok Surawong
Under Development:
Red Planet Bangkok Sukhumvit 8

Operational:
Red Planet Bekasi
Red Planet Makassar
Red Planet Palembang
Red Planet Jakarta Pasar Baru
Red Planet Pekanbaru
Red Planet Solo
Red Planet Surabaya

Operational:
Red Planet Tokyo Asakusa
Red Planet Gotanda Tokyo
Red Planet Okinawa Naha
Red Planet Nagoya Nishiki
Red Planet Sapporo Susukino South
Red Planet Sapporo Susukino Central
Red Planet Hiroshima

Under Development:
Red Planet Kyoto Nijo

References

Hotel chains
Hospitality companies of Thailand